John Arthur Storer (3 February 1908 – after 1932) was an English footballer who played in the Football League for Barnsley, Bristol Rovers and Mansfield Town.

References

1908 births
Year of death missing
People from Mexborough
Footballers from Doncaster
Association football forwards
English footballers
Mexborough Athletic F.C. players
Barnsley F.C. players
Bristol Rovers F.C. players
Mansfield Town F.C. players
Lisburn Distillery F.C. players
English Football League players